Turgut Reis Mosque may refer to any of the below:

 Turgut Reis Mosque (Balchik) is a mosque in Balchik, Bulgaria

 Turgut Reis Mosque (Esenler) is a mosque in Istanbul, Turkey

 Turgut Reis Mosque (Sultanbeyli) is a mosque in Istanbul, Turkey